Hop is a 2011 American fantasy comedy film co-produced by Illumination Entertainment and Relativity Media, and distributed by Universal Pictures. The film was directed by Tim Hill and produced by Chris Meledandri and Michele Imperato Stabile, from a screenplay written by Brian Lynch and the writing team of Cinco Paul and Ken Daurio. Paul and Daurio also conceived the film's story. Starring James Marsden, Russell Brand, Kaley Cuoco, Hank Azaria, Gary Cole, Elizabeth Perkins, David Hasselhoff, Chelsea Handler, and Hugh Laurie, the film follows a young rabbit who would rather drum in a band than succeed his father as the Easter Bunny, and befriends a human slacker seeking a job.

Hop premiered at Universal Studios in Hollywood on March 27, 2011, and was theatrically released in the United States on April 1, by Universal Pictures, and it received generally negative reviews from critics. During its theatrical run, the film earned $184million at the box office, against a budget of $63 million. To date, it is the only Illumination film that combines live-action photography with animation.

Plot
On Easter Island, a young rabbit named E.B. is intended to succeed his father as the Easter Bunny. Intimidated by the calling's demands and ignoring his father's orders, E.B. runs away to Hollywood to pursue his dream of becoming a drummer. In Van Nuys, E.B. is hit by Fred O'Hare, an out-of-work, job-hopping slacker who was driving to his sister Sam's boss's house to house-sit, while his parents forced him to move out. Feigning injury, E.B. persuades Fred to take him in as he recovers, but when E.B. causes trouble, Fred attempts to release him in the wilderness. E.B. persuades to help him by claiming to be the Easter Bunny, whom Fred as a child had witnessed delivering eggs.

E.B.'s father sends his royal guards, the Pink Berets, to search for him and bring him back. In Hollywood, E.B. sees the Berets closing in on him and hides inside a business where Fred is having a job interview. E.B. enjoys a successful recording session with The Blind Boys of Alabama as their substitute drummer, but ruins Fred's job interview. In the process, E.B. gets a tip about a possible audition for David Hasselhoff, who invites him to perform on his show.

Afterwards, Fred attends his adoptive younger sister Alex's school Easter pageant with E.B. hiding in a satchel. E.B., alarmed that the Pink Berets have apparently found him due to the three bunny suit shadows on a wall and disgusted by Alex's awful rendition of "Peter Cottontail", dashes out and disrupts the show, forcing Fred to feign a ventriloquist's act with E.B.'s cooperation as his dummy and leading the show in singing, "I Want Candy". Both Fred's father Henry and Alex are angry about the upstaging, but Fred is inspired to be the Easter Bunny himself. Although skeptical, E.B. agrees to train him and finds that Fred has some genuine talent for it.

Meanwhile, the Easter Bunny's second-in-command Carlos the Chick plots a coup d'état against him to take over Easter. Carlos inspires the chicks to uprise the bunnies and begins training to become the Easter Bunny, or, Easter Chick, but seems to lack the qualities an Easter Bunny needs. As the Pink Berets close in on him, E.B. prepares a decoy to fake his death and leaves for Hasselhoff's show. The Berets see the decoy and, horrified that Fred has apparently killed E.B., capture him and take him to Easter Island. Fred is confronted by E.B.'s father and Carlos, however Carlos pretends to be upset about E.B.'s death, silences Fred when he tries to tell the truth, and seizes control of the Easter factory, tying up E.B.'s father and placing him and Fred to be boiled alive. Meanwhile, E.B. starts to feel guilty for acting selfish and leaving Fred, and is convinced by Hasselhoff on his show to go back and help his friend.

E.B. races back to the factory. He confronts Carlos, but is immobilized in gummy candy and tossed into the chocolate bunny carving line. E.B. survives by dodging the blades of the machine, while Fred eats through the black-licorice ropes, escaping with E.B’s father, who couldn’t eat through due to the poor taste of the candy. Carlos, now a chick-bunny combination due to the magic of The Egg of Destiny, battles with E.B. and defeats him easily due to his size. Carlos then tries to lead the Egg Sleigh out with his sidekick Phil directing, but E.B. improvises a drum session that drives Phil to uncontrollably dance to the beat and provide the wrong signals, causing the sleigh to crash and subdue Carlos. E.B. and his father reconcile, and he and Fred are crowned co-Easter bunnies, while Carlos is forced to pull the Egg Sleigh.

Cast
The cast in order of production notes listing:

Live-action cast actors
 James Marsden as Frederick "Fred" O'Hare, an out of work slacker who is trying to find work
 Coleton Ray as Young Fred
 Kaley Cuoco as Samantha "Sam" O'Hare, Fred's younger sister
 Gary Cole as Henry O'Hare, Fred's father
 Elizabeth Perkins as Bonnie O'Hare, Fred's mother
 Tiffany Espensen as Alexandra "Alex" O'Hare, Fred's adoptive younger sister
 David Hasselhoff as Himself, the host of "Hoff Knows Talent"
 Chelsea Handler as Mrs. Beck, a video game company member and Fred's interviewer
 Dustin Ybarra as Cody

Voice cast actors
 Russell Brand as E.B., a rabbit who dreams of becoming a drummer rather than following his father's footsteps to be the next Easter Bunny.
 Django Marsh as Young E.B.
 Brand also portrays a "Hoff Knows Talent" production assistant.
 Hank Azaria as Carlos, a Spanish-accented chick who schemes to take over Easter Island
 Azaria also voices Phil, Carlos' naive and good-natured sidekick.
 Hugh Laurie as Mr. Bunny (credited as "E.B.'s Dad"), E.B.'s father who is the current Easter Bunny.
 Hugh Hefner as Voice at Playboy Mansion

Production

Animation and character design
The animated characters were designed by Peter de Sève. The CGI animation of the film was made by Los Angeles-based Rhythm & Hues Studios.

Release

Promotion and marketing
Universal teamed up with 92 major companies to promote Hop, including Holiday Inn, Krispy Kreme, Lindt, Kraft Foods, The Hershey Company, Build-A-Bear Workshop, Comcast, Kodak, Hallmark, HMV, and Burger King. A large range of licensed merchandise was released in connection with the film, including toys, stuffed animals, many sorts of candy, T-shirts, cookie decorating kits, baked goods and other products from Kraft Foods. Some items were available exclusively at Walmart stores. The premiere of Hop took place at Universal Studios Hollywood on March 27, 2011.

Video games
A Hop video game was released only for the Nintendo DS alongside the film. On March 29, 2011, a crossover game featuring Hop and Doodle Jump was released on the App Store for iPhone, iPad and iPod Touch. All 25 levels being available after the film's release. As part of Doodle Jump in-app purchases with downloads, a new level can be selected through naming at Hop game over screen.

Home media
Universal Pictures Home Entertainment released Hop on DVD and Blu-ray on March 23, 2012. Physical copies include featurettes and games, with a short film Phil's Dance Party.

Reception

Box office
Hop earned $108.5million in the United States and Canada and $75.9million in other countries, for a worldwide total of $184.4million. To date, it is the lowest grossing film released by Illumination.

The film was released on April 1, 2011. Hop earned $11.5million on its first day. The film debuted earning $38million from 3,579 theaters. Its second weekend earnings dropped by 42 percent to $21.7million, and followed by another $11.1million the third weekend. Hop completed its theatrical run in the United States and Canada on August 19, 2011.

Critical response
Its critical consensus reads, "It's impressively animated, but Hops script is so uninspired that not even James Marsden's frantic mugging can give it any bounce." On Metacritic, the film has a weighted average score of 41 out of 100 based on reviews from 23 critics, indicating "mixed or average reviews". Audiences polled by CinemaScore gave the film an average grade of "A−" on an A+ to F scale.

The subplot involving Carlos the Easter Chick was considered to be insensitive to Mexican Americans by one reviewer. Peter Debruge of Variety called it "hilariously un-PC".

Accolades and awards
Andrew Arnett won an award for Character Animation in a Live Action Production for work on this film at the 2012 Kids Choice Awards.

References

External links
 
 
 
 

2011 films
2011 comedy films
2011 computer-animated films
2010s American animated films
2010s fantasy comedy films
2010s English-language films
American computer-animated films
American children's animated comedy films
American children's animated fantasy films
American films with live action and animation
Animated films about rabbits and hares
Easter Bunny in film
Films about father–son relationships
Animated films about chickens
Animated films about friendship
Films about coups d'état
Animated films set in Los Angeles
Films shot in Los Angeles
Films set in Chile
Films set in Easter Island
Films set in 2011
Films directed by Tim Hill
Films produced by Chris Meledandri
Films with screenplays by Cinco Paul and Ken Daurio
Films scored by Christopher Lennertz
Universal Pictures films
Universal Pictures animated films
Illumination (company) animated films